Champel is a neighborhood in the city of Geneva, Switzerland.

Champel is widely considered a posh, high-class neighbourhood due to its numerous parks and natural spaces, very luxurious apartments and proximity to the city center.  Residences mostly consist of mid-range to high-scale apartments.  Champel is home to Cité Universitaire, a hostel-like complex for students of the University of Geneva.

Geography

Champel is in close proximity to Florissant, which like Champel is an exclusive neighborhood, bordered by the neighborhood of Eaux-Vives to the north, the municipality of Veyrier to the east, the municipality of Carouge to the south and the city center to the west, occupying an area of approximately 1.9 km2.

Sights
The 'plateau de Champel' is the center of the neighbourhood. The 'Parc Bertrand' is a popular  park, featuring a former primary school (which is now a day-care center), a fenced dog park, a playground for small children as well as a wading pool. The neo-gothic 'Tour de Champel'  on the edge of the cliffs overlooking the Arve is a scenic view.

Notable people
 Michael Servetus (1509 or 1511 – 1553), Spanish theologian, physician, cartographer, and Renaissance humanist, was executed at the Plateau of Champel
 Lydia Welti-Escher (1858–1891), patron of the arts and founder of the Gottfried Keller Stiftung, committed suicide in her house in Champel

References
 City of Geneva : Districts of Geneva - Champel

External links
Cité Universitaire website

Geography of Geneva